Johnathan Steinberg is an American Democratic Party politician currently serving as a member of the Connecticut House of Representatives from the 136th district, which encompasses part of Westport, since 2011.

Early life and education
Steinberg grew up in Westport and graduated from Staples High School in 1974.

Career

Steinberg was first elected in 2010 over Republican Nitzy Cohen. In 2021, Steinberg unsuccessfully sought election for First Selectman of Westport, losing to Republican Jennifer Tooker. Steinberg currently serves as co-chair of the House Public Health Committee, and as a member of the Transportation Committee and the Energy and Technology Committee.

References

Living people
Democratic Party members of the Connecticut House of Representatives
People from Westport, Connecticut
21st-century American politicians
Yale University alumni
Year of birth missing (living people)